Lyn-Wannan Tawaki Kam is a Nauruan politician, and former sports figure.

Parliamentary role

He stood unsuccessfully for the 2010 general elections, then was elected Member of Parliament for Meneng in the June 2013 general elections. As there are no political parties in Nauru, Kam sits as an independent.

Role in sport

He is also an amateur athlete, and won a gold medal in powerlifting (men's 125 kg+ category) in the inaugural Nauru Games in 2009.

References

Members of the Parliament of Nauru
Living people
People from Meneng District
21st-century Nauruan politicians
Year of birth missing (living people)